Arne Werner Pedersen (7 September 1917 – 11 July 1959) was a Danish cyclist. He competed in the 1000m time trial and team pursuit events at the 1936 Summer Olympics. He also won the bronze medal in the individual pursuit at the 1946 UCI Track Cycling World Championships.

References

External links
 

1917 births
1959 deaths
Danish male cyclists
Olympic cyclists of Denmark
Cyclists at the 1936 Summer Olympics
Cyclists from Copenhagen